The Outlaws  is a 2017 South Korean crime action film, written and directed by Kang Yoon-sung, starring Ma Dong-seok and Yoon Kye-sang. It was released on October 3, 2017. Set in 2004, the film revolves around Detective Ma Seok-do, who tries to control the gang-wars between Chinese-Korean gangs while also dealing with a ruthless loan shark named Jang-Chen.

The Outlaws is the first installment of Crime City series. It was followed by a sequel titled The Roundup, which was released in 2022 and another sequel titled The Roundup: No Way Out is in production.

Plot
In South Korea, a turf war that grows between a local gang that runs Garibong-dong in Guro District, Seoul and the Heuksapa gang from Yanbian, The police are called in to attempt to bring peace to the neighborhood. Jang Chen is a bloodthirsty leader of the Chinese mainland gang "Black Dragon", who works as a loan shark in a seedy Chinatown area of Seoul. He's backed up by his henchmen Wei Sung-Rak and Yang-Tae. Jang Chen is beyond brutal in his methods to collect money. 

Meanwhile, Ma Suk-Do is a detective in the Chinatown area of Seoul, who along with his Captain Jeon Il-man tries to keep the peace, while two Chinese-Korean gangs dubbed "Venom Gang" headed by and Ahn Sung-Tae and '"Cobra Gang" headed by Jang-I-Soo as they battle over the turf in the neighborhood. Jang Chen, along with Sung-Rak and Yang-Tae makes their move to take over Chinatown and destroy the Venom Gang and kill Sung-Tae where they take over Jang-I-Soo's casino. Enraged, Jang-I-Soo attacks the casino. Sung-Rak and Yung-Tae fight with Jang-I-Soo and his henchmen, but are interrupted by Ma, who arrest Sung-Rak while Yang-Tae escapes and informs Jang-Chen. 

Ma and Jeon learn about Jang Chen's crimes where they plan to arrest him. The next day, Jang Chen, along with Yang-Tae attacks Jang-I-soo and his henchmen where he, along with Yang-Tae kill them at Jang-I-Soo's mother's birthday bash. Later, Jang Chen's location is informed by the hotelier to CEO Hwang (Jang Chen and his henchmen had killed their men in the hotel), who along with his henchmen arrive and tries to kill Jang Chen, but the latter manages to escape and the hotelier is later killed by Jang Chen, who later learns Hwang's involvement. Ma seeks the help of Chinatown colony members for help to catch the Chinese moneylenders. They accept and start taking photos of the moneylenders and the people. 

Ma and his fellow police officers arrest all of them, including Yang-Tae. One of the police officer named Kang Hong-seok gets caught by Jang Chen and is about to run a car over him, but Ma saves him by crashing into Jang Chen's car. Jang Chen escapes and Ma chases after him but loses sight of him after a while. Jang Chen reaches the airport to fly away to China where he leaves for the restroom. Ma arrives at the restroom and a combat ensues between them. Ma manages to knock down Jang Chen and leaves him handcuffed in the restroom. The gang leaders are arrested and Jeon is congratulated by the commissioner where Ma and his team celebrate for solving the case. Just then, Ma is called by the commissioner to investigate another case.

Cast

Main
Ma Dong-seok as Ma Seok-do

 A police officer in Seoul's Crime Unit who fears nothing. He is given ten days to put an end to Chinese-Korean gang wars in the Garibong district. 
Yoon Kye-sang as Jang Chen

 A notorious crime lord, from Harbin, China, leader of Heilungbo (黒龙波, one of chinese mafia）who comes to Garibong to collect debts. He is known for dismembering anyone who puts up a fight. 
Jo Jae-yoon as Boss Hwang Choon-sik
Choi Gwi-hwa as Captain Jeon Il-man

Supporting

Im Hyung-joon as Do Seung-woo
Jin Seon-kyu as Wi Seong-rak
Hong Ki-joon as Park Byeong-sik
Heo Dong-won as Oh Dong-gyoon
Ha Jun as Kang Hong-seok
Kim Sung-kyu as Yang-tae
Park Ji-hwan as Jang I-soo
Heo Sung-tae as Viper 
Min Kyung-jin as Yeon Gil Restaurant CEO 
Uhm Ji-sung as Wang-oh
Kim Gu-taek as CEO Kwak
Park Sang-gyu as CEO Won
Yoo Ji-yeon as Ahn Hye-kyeong

Special appearances  
Cho Jin-woong as Chief of Regional police investigation unit
Jung In-gi as Chief of police 
Oh Min-ae as Garibong-dong female merchant
Ye Jung-hwa as Airport head
Yoon Joo as Kang Hong-seok's fiancée

Production

Filming
Principal photography began on February 27, 2017 and ended on July 19, 2017.

Original soundtrack

Reception 
The Outlaws opened in South Korea on October 3, 2017. By October 23, it grossed  from more than 5 million admissions. One month after it was released, the film marked 6.05 million admissions, with  gross.

Awards and nominations

Sequels 

 The Roundup (2022)

A sequel of the film titled as The Roundup directed by Lee Sang-yong was released on May 18, 2022. Ma Dong-seok, Choi Gwi-hwa, Park Ji-hwan, Heo Dong-won, and Ha Jun reprised their roles. The film became the highest-grossing film of the year surpassing 10 million ticket sales on the 25th day since its release. It also became the 3rd highest-grossing film and 9th most viewed film in South Korean cinema history.

 The Roundup: No Way Out (2023)

The production of a second sequel under title The Roundup: No Way Out is currently in progress with a target release in 2023.

Remake 
The film is remade in Hindi as Radhe, which is directed by Prabhu Deva, and was released on 13 May 2021. However, the film became a box-office bomb.

References

External links
 
 
 
 

2017 films
2010s Korean-language films
2017 crime action films
South Korean films remade in other languages
South Korean crime action films
South Korean gangster films
South Korean police films
Crime films based on actual events
Action films based on actual events
Films set in 2004
Films set in Seoul
2010s South Korean films